William Allen Clark (March 1842 in Cincinnati, Ohio – October 20, 1913 in Knoxville, Tennessee) was an American archer who competed in the 1904 Summer Olympics. He won the silver medal in the team competition. In the Double American round he finished sixth.

References

External links

William Clark's profile at databaseOlympics

1842 births
1913 deaths
American male archers
Archers at the 1904 Summer Olympics
Olympic silver medalists for the United States in archery
Medalists at the 1904 Summer Olympics
Date of birth missing
Sportspeople from Cincinnati